Eduard Andreas Dominicus Hendricus Jozef "Edwin" Zoetebier (born 7 May 1970) is a Dutch former professional footballer who played as a goalkeeper.

Career
Zoetebier was born in Purmerend, North Holland. He started his professional career in the 1988–89 season playing for FC Volendam. He later served Sunderland, Feyenoord, Vitesse Arnhem, PSV Eindhoven and NAC Breda. Zoetebier signed for Sunderland in the summer of 1997 as back up to Lionel Pérez. However, he left in January 1998 having made just two appearances for the club (both in the League Cup). His career highlight was being the starting goalkeeper for Feyenoord in the 2002 UEFA Cup Final against Borussia Dortmund as the Dutch club won 3–2. He also played in the 2002 UEFA Super Cup against Real Madrid which saw the Spanish side prevail 2–1. He was also an unplayed member of the Feyenoord side which won the Eredivisie in 1998–99 and the Dutch Super Cup in 1999 as Jerzy Dudek was the team's first-choice goalkeeper.

He joined FC Volendam as goalkeeping coach in 2008.

Honours
Feyenoord
 Eredivisie: 1998–99
 Johan Cruyff Shield: 1999
 UEFA Cup: 2001–02

References

External links
  Profile

1970 births
Living people
People from Purmerend
Dutch footballers
Association football goalkeepers
Eredivisie players
FC Volendam players
SBV Vitesse players
Feyenoord players
PSV Eindhoven players
Sunderland A.F.C. players
NAC Breda players
UEFA Cup winning players
FC Volendam non-playing staff
Footballers from North Holland